The 2005–06 Belarusian Extraliga season was the 14th season of the Belarusian Extraliga, the top level of ice hockey in Belarus. Twelve teams participated in the league, and HK Yunost Minsk won the championship.

Regular season

Playoffs
Quarterfinals
HK Yunost Minsk - HK Neman Grodno 3-0 on series
HK Khimvolokno Mogilev - HK Sokil Kiev 3-0 on series
HC Dinamo Minsk - HK Gomel 3-0 on series
HK Riga 2000 - HK Keramin Minsk 3-1 on series
Semifinals
HK Yunost Minsk - HK Khimvolokno Mogilev 3-1 on series
HC Dinamo Minsk - HK Riga 2000 3-0 on series
Final
HK Yunost Minsk - HC Dinamo Minsk 4-0 on series
3rd place
HK Riga 2000 - HK Khimvolokno Mogilev 2-0 on series

External links 
 Season on hockeyarchives.info

Belarusian Extraleague
Belarusian Extraleague seasons
Extra